On the Road to Calais is a 1919 song performed by Al Jolson in Sinbad. The music was composed by Al Jolson with the lyrics written by Alfred Bryan. It was published by Jerome H. Remick & Co.

Based on sales estimates, the song reached a peak position of No.5 on the Top 100 US songs of its time.

References

1919 songs
Songs of World War I
Songs about France
Songs about cities
Songs written by Al Jolson
Songs with lyrics by Alfred Bryan
Al Jolson songs